"That Way" is a song by American rapper Lil Uzi Vert. It was released on March 1, 2020, by Generation Now and Atlantic Records as the second single from their second studio album Eternal Atake. The song prominently interpolates the hook of the Backstreet Boys' "I Want It That Way" (1999).

Critical reception
Alphonse Pierre of Pitchfork viewed the song as the rapper's "return to the shoulder shimmying, eye-rolling, singing Hayley Williams in the backseat of a car Uzi, whose animated personality made [their] meteoric rise possible". In context of the album, Charles Homes and Elias Leight at Rolling Stone described the composition of the song as "a jarringly saccharine sample of the Backstreet Boys' 1999 hit "I Want It That Way"" in connection  "with a jittery, steamrolling track built around the music from Microsoft Windows' videogame Space Cadet 3D Pinball". As for Uzi's performance on the song, Carl Lamarre concluded that they are in their "element, spraying lighthearted bars over the breezy track" and called the song an "earworm".

Responses
Backstreet Boys member Nick Carter praised the song on his Twitter and told Uzi that he wants them to be "featured on our next album".

Cover Art Controversy
The cover art has been subject to allegations of plagiarism. On March 14, 2020, an online artist under the alias of 'hugeriver8' on Instagram claimed that the cover art plagiarizes a nearly identical piece they posted on their blog in 2014. The human figure on the cover art has also been claimed to be copied from a different artist under the alias of 'la_la_la_fries', for a piece of fanart of the guitarist Pete Townshend of The Who, which was first posted on Instagram in late November 2015.

When prompted, the artist of the That Way album cover responded that he simply designed what Lil Uzi Vert had asked him to design, and that the picture he is alleged to have plagiarized was sent as reference work. Following this, Lil Uzi Vert left a comment saying, "Hey I’m not a mean person or a thief I get inspired a lot. If you want Money I will have my team contact and give you Money. Signed… Baby Pluto. P.S. You are a great artist." No further allegations have been made beyond this, and the comment appears to have settled the matter.

Charts

Weekly charts

Year-end charts

Certifications

References

2020 singles
2020 songs
Lil Uzi Vert songs
Songs written by Max Martin
Songs written by Andreas Carlsson
Songs written by Lil Uzi Vert